The 1956 Canada Cup took place 24–26 June on the West Course at the Wentworth Club in Virginia Water, Surrey, England. It was the fourth Canada Cup event, which became the World Cup in 1967. The tournament was a 72-hole stroke play team event with 29 teams. The Scandinavian team that had competed in 1954 and 1955 was replaced by teams from Denmark and Sweden, while there were new teams from Chinese Taipei, Portugal and South Korea. Each team consisted of two players from a country. The combined score of each team determined the team results. 18 holes were played on the first two days with 36 holes played on the final day. Because of the time taken to play each round, a cut was introduced after the second day, with only the leading 20 teams competing on the final day. An 18-hole consolation event was held for the remaining 9 teams. There was provision for an individual in one of these 9 teams to complete the 72 holes if they were well-placed after the second day.

The American team of Ben Hogan and Sam Snead won by 14 strokes over the South African team of Bobby Locke and Gary Player. The individual competition was won by Hogan, five shots ahead of Roberto De Vicenzo.

Teams

Source:

Note: De Vicenzo was representing Mexico, having played for Argentina in the three previous Canada Cup events.

Scores
Team

Source

International Trophy

Source

References

World Cup (men's golf)
Golf tournaments in England
Canada Cup
Canada Cup
Canada Cup